James Geddes may refer to:

James Geddes (engineer) (1763–1838), American engineer, surveyor, New York State legislator and U.S. Congressman
James Geddes (Louisville and Nashville Railroad), namesake of James Geddes Engine Company No. 6, Nashville, Tennessee
James Davidson Geddes (c. 1844–1895), Canadian accountant, rancher and politician
James Lorraine Geddes (1827–1887), British Army and Union Army soldier
Jim Geddes (born 1949), American Major League Baseball pitcher